Alexander Gilmour may refer to:

Sir Alexander Gilmour, 1st Baronet (1657–1731), Scottish MP
Sir Alexander Gilmour, 3rd Baronet (c. 1737–1792), Scottish MP

See also
Gilmour (surname)